Pigeon Roost Creek may refer to:

Pigeon Roost Creek (Indiana)
Pigeon Roost Creek (Missouri)